Valéry Ondo (born 14 August 1967) is a Gabonese footballer. He played in 36 matches for the Gabon national football team from 1992 to 2001. He was also named in Gabon's squad for the 1994 African Cup of Nations tournament.

References

External links
 

1967 births
Living people
Gabonese footballers
Gabon international footballers
1994 African Cup of Nations players
1996 African Cup of Nations players
Place of birth missing (living people)
Association football midfielders
21st-century Gabonese people